The Donegal Progressive Party was a minor political party in the Republic of Ireland.

The party drew its support mostly from the unionist and Protestant community in eastern County Donegal. It was opposed to a united Ireland. At the 1973 general election, the party's leader advised Protestants to vote for Fianna Fáil, as it had "the most stable policy" on the border question. Throughout the 1980s and 90s, the party held a single seat on Donegal County Council, but it lost this at the 1999 local elections.

Jim Devenney, a butcher and member of the East Donegal Ulster Scots Association and the former deputy chairman of the Ulster-Scots Agency, was the party's final representative, also contested Donegal North-East at the 1992 and 1997 general elections, and stood in Letterkenny again in 2004. The party was removed from the Register of Political Parties in November 2009.

References 

Unionism in Ireland
Defunct political parties in the Republic of Ireland
Political parties disestablished in 2009
Politics of County Donegal
2009 disestablishments in Ireland